A special election was held in  on October 23, 1820 to fill a vacancy created by the resignation of Jonathan Mason (F) on May 15, 1820.  As a majority was not achieved on the first ballot, a second ballot was held November 6, 1820

Election results

Gorham took his seat on November 27, 1820.

See also
List of special elections to the United States House of Representatives

Notes

References

Massachusetts 1820 01
Massachusetts 1820 01
1820 01
Massachusetts 01
United States House of Representatives 01
United States House of Representatives 1820 01